Philip Sendak (September 15, 1894 – June 14, 1970) was a writer of children's literature. He is the father of the writer and illustrator Maurice Sendak and the children's writer Jack Sendak.

He emigrated from Poland to United States in 1913.

Sendak died at the age of 75.

Selected bibliography
 In Grandpa's House (1985) (illustrated by his son Maurice Sendak)

References

External links 

American children's writers
1894 births
1970 deaths
Maurice Sendak
Congress Poland emigrants to the United States
19th-century Polish Jews